Miguel de Cervantes Liceum, officially the Miguel de Cervantes XXXIV General Education Liceum with Bilingual Branches in Warsaw, is a public general education liceum (secondary school) in Warsaw, Poland. In the years 1945-1991 was named the Karol Świerczewski Liceum.

History 
The school was established on 28 September 1945. A year later it was named after general Karol Świerczewski pseud. Walter. In the mid-1950s, the school was located in a building at ul. Zakrzewska 24. In the following years of the facility's existence, the scientific movement developed and a scout team was established. At the beginning of the 90s, a sports hall was put into use.

On 23 April 1991, the school was named after the Spanish writer Miguel de Cervantes.

Notable alumni 
 Piotr Fronczewski – actor
 Joanna Jabłczyńska – actress
 Karol Kłos – volleyball player
 Marcin Kołodyński – actor and TV presenter
 Paweł Poncyljusz – politician

Notes

References 

1945 establishments in Poland
Schools in Warsaw
Educational institutions established in 1945